Al-Zirbah  is a Syrian village located in Mount Simeon District, Aleppo. According to the Syria Central Bureau of Statistics (CBS), Al-Zirbah had a population of 4,760 in the 2004 census.

References 

Populated places in Mount Simeon District